Ivan Yurievich Zhdanov (born August 17, 1988) is a Russian politician and lawyer. He was the director of the Anti-Corruption Foundation (FBK) and is a member of the Central Council of the Russia of the Future political party.

Biography 
Ivan Zhdanov was born on August 17, 1988 in Moscow, in a military family. In 2005 he entered the Moscow State Law University, from which he graduated in 2010, and was also a graduate student there until 2013.

After practicing in the Federal Antimonopoly Service and the State Duma apparatus in 2011—2013, he was engaged in his own legal practice, headed the regional branch of the People's Alliance political party in the Nenets Autonomous District.

In 2014, he began working at the Anti-Corruption Foundation as a lawyer, and later was appointed head of the legal department of FBK. He worked in Rostov-on-Don.

During the election campaign in Novosibirsk in 2015, a criminal case was opened against Ivan Zhdanov under Art. 142 of the Criminal Code of the Russian Federation "Falsification of electoral documents, referendum documents."

During the pre-election campaign, a criminal case was opened against Ivan Zhdanov for alleged evasion of military service (part 1 of article 328 of the Criminal Code of Russia), and searches were conducted in his apartment. Subsequently, the elections were canceled by the Central Election Commission of the Russian Federation (CEC); representatives of the FBK linked the cancellation of the elections with the complaints they filed regarding early voting, but the head of the CEC said that the elections were canceled for completely different reasons. Zhdanov said that the cancellation of the election results is a confirmation of the rightness of the candidates from the Anti-Corruption Foundation.

Navalny's presidential campaign 

In 2017—2018, he took part in the election campaign for the admission to the presidential election of Alexei Navalny. Several times during the campaign he defended the head of Navalny's headquarters, Leonid Volkov, in court, who was brought to administrative responsibility for alleged "repeated violation of the order of organizing a public event." He chaired the meeting to nominate Navalny as a candidate.

From May 19, 2018 to March 28, 2019, he was the Secretary of the Central Council of the Russia of the Future.

On May 24, 2018, he was detained in Moscow on suspicion of violating the rules of organizing or holding a rally He's Not our Tsar on May 5. He faced 10 days of administrative arrest. However, on May 5 Zhdanov was at an authorized rally in Rostov-on-Don and did not write a single tweet about the rally. Subsequently, the Tverskoy Court of Moscow fined Zhdanov 20 thousand rubles.

On October 25, Ivan Zhdanov was again detained in Moscow. On October 27, the Simonovsky Court of Moscow fined Zhdanov 250 thousand rubles for participating in an online broadcast of actions against  on September 9.

Since December 2018, he has been appointed director of the Anti-Corruption Foundation. Vyacheslav Gimadi was appointed the new head of the legal department.

2019 Moscow City Duma election 
He was a self-nominated candidate for deputies of the Moscow City Duma in the 2019 elections in electoral district No. 8 (Airport, Voikovsky, Koptevo, Sokol). The election headquarters of the candidate was headed by Boris Zolotarevsky, coordinator of Navalny's Chelyabinsk headquarters. The team managed to collect about 5,700 signatures (enough to be submitted to the district election commission), which were submitted on July 6. According to the results of the verification, the employees of the election commission 100% declared that 1180 out of 5700 signatures are invalid, which is 21% of the total number of signatures, with 10% of “defective” signatures allowed, this was the reason for removing Zhdanov from the election race. Zhdanov, along with a number of other opposition candidates, did not agree with the results of the signature verification, declared the rejection of signatures was illegal, pointing to the political motivation of the decision to prevent opposition candidates from running for the elections. After that, he, together with other opposition candidates, participated in daily protests, and also spoke at a rally on Sakharov Avenue on July 20 for the admission of all opposition candidates to the city duma elections. He took part in single pickets for admitting independent candidates to the elections, for which he was also detained and released without drawing up a protocol on July 22. On the night of July 25, police officers came to Zhdanov's apartment with a search, and on the same night took him away for interrogation within the framework of a criminal case initiated the day before under Article 141. On July 27, he was arrested in the morning before the start of the action. By evening, he and other unregistered candidates were released. The second time that day he was detained by the police at Trubnaya Square. On July 29, the court arrested Zhdanov for 15 days, after which, contrary to the law, he was taken to serve his arrest in another region — the Moscow region, the city of Lyubertsy.

On August 2, the Moscow City Court recognized as legal the refusal to register Ivan Zhdanov as a candidate for the Moscow City Duma, despite the fact that the certificate of the Ministry of Internal Affairs contradicted the agreement between the CEC and the Ministry of Internal Affairs (the court decided that the agreement was of a recommendatory nature, and it was impossible to disclose personal data from the database of the Ministry of Internal Affairs), as well as refused to consider confirmation of Muscovites that they really gave a signature for Zhdanov. In response, Zhdanov went on a hunger strike: “I no longer have any ways and opportunities to convey my position. From that day on, I go on a hunger strike and refuse to eat. I will not answer any more questions, I refuse to participate in this hearing."

On August 19, Zhdanov said: "Obviously and one hundred percent I will not be on the ballot paper for the Moscow City Duma elections in the 8th district (Sokol, Airport, Voikovsky, Koptevo)" and asked all his supporters in the district to support opposition candidate Darya Besedina. Leonid Volkov said that Smart Voting also supports Besedina.

On December 6, Ivan Zhdanov was detained for participating in a rally that took place on July 14 near the building of the Moscow City Electoral Commission. The court appointed him 10 days of administrative arrest. On December 16, Zhdanov was again detained at the exit from the special detention center, but was soon released.

2021 State Duma elections 
On December 16, 2019, Zhdanov announced his intention to run as a deputy in the 2021 Russian legislative election. He also added that he made this decision while arrested.

Criminal cases 
On August 22, 2019, a criminal case was initiated against Ivan Zhdanov under Part 2 of Article 315 of the Criminal Code "Failure to enforce a court verdict, court decision or other judicial act", due to the fact that he "does not execute the court decision and does not remove the film He Is Not Dimon to You", despite the fact that the film was posted on Navalny's personal YouTube channel. Earlier, because of the same film, a criminal case had already been initiated against the former director of the FBK Roman Rubanov. Also, two more criminal cases were opened — under Art. 141 of the Criminal Code "Obstruction of the exercise of electoral rights or the work of election commissions", as well as paragraph "b" of Part 4 of Art. 174 of the Criminal Code "Legalization (laundering) of funds or other property acquired by a person as a result of a crime".

References

External links 
  - official website.

1988 births
Living people
21st-century jurists
21st-century Russian politicians
Alexei Navalny
Anti-Corruption Foundation
Kutafin Moscow State Law University alumni
Russian activists against the 2022 Russian invasion of Ukraine
Russian anti-corruption activists
Russian prisoners and detainees
People listed in Russia as foreign agents